Omloop is a surname. Notable people with the surname include:

 Geert Omloop (born 1974), Belgian road racing cyclist
 Laura Omloop (born 1999), Belgian pop singer
 Wim Omloop (born 1971), Belgian cyclist

See also
 

Surnames of Belgian origin